John Mackie, Baron John-Mackie (24 November 1909 – 25 May 1994) was a British Labour MP.

Born on a farm in Scotland, Mackie was educated at Aberdeen Grammar School before himself becoming a farmer.  He joined the Labour Party, and stood unsuccessfully in North Angus and Mearns at the 1951 United Kingdom general election, and Lanark at the 1955 United Kingdom general election.  He finally won election in Enfield East at the 1959 United Kingdom general election.

Mackie was Parliamentary Secretary to the Ministry of Agriculture, Fisheries and Food in the Labour Government 1964-1970.  He stood down in 1974, and in 1976 he was appointed as chair of the Forestry Commission.  On 18 May 1981, he was created a life peer with the title Baron John-Mackie, of Nazeing in the County of Essex.

His older brother was Sir Maitland Mackie and younger brother was the Liberal MP George Mackie, Baron Mackie of Benshie. His son, George Mackie, was a Scotland international rugby union player.

References

External links 
 

1909 births
1994 deaths
John-Mackie
Labour Party (UK) MPs for English constituencies
UK MPs 1959–1964
UK MPs 1964–1966
UK MPs 1966–1970
UK MPs 1970–1974
Ministers in the Wilson governments, 1964–1970
Life peers created by Elizabeth II